The 2003 Paris–Roubaix was the 101st running of the Paris–Roubaix single-day cycling race, often known as the Hell of the North. These are the results for the 2003 edition of the Paris–Roubaix cycling classic, in which Peter Van Petegem entered history by doing the double with his Tour of Flanders win, 26 years after Roger De Vlaeminck. This edition was run under clear skies and relatively good weather.

Results
13-04-2003: Compiègne–Roubaix, 259 km.

References

External links
Race website

2003
Paris-Roubaix
2003 in French sport
2003 in road cycling
April 2003 sports events in Europe